A Notice of Hearing is a prepared legal document that invokes all parties to hear a motion and may be emitted by any party. Most notably the notice contains a time and date for the court clerk to amend schedule for and what motion will be attempted. Permission to schedule is not required since making motions are protected right.

This kind of motion comes after the commencement of action and summons and until final judgment. One example is a motion to rule a defendant is not responding to summons (to rule against the defendant automatically). Another example is a defendant's motion to object to the summons.

Motions require both sides to be present. A "Notice of Hearing" must be delivered to all parties concerning: the court clerk, the plaintiff, and the defendant. The date requested must allow all parties due time to prepare. Whether proof of delivery is required is a particular.

Many specifics of what must be on the notification are determined by local regulations. Some specifics include the amount of time the defendant has to respond to the notice (for example, two weeks), the anticipated length of the court session, and any relevant legal disclaimers and warnings.

Often a locality has simple pre-prepared forms available with the clerk and on the internet. Several will be needed.

In the U.S. "the Friday docket" is iconic. A writer of a "Notice of Hearing" needs only to know which hours of Friday their kinds of motions are heard (by the presiding judge of the case) and schedule a Friday couple weeks out from delivery to all parties.

Law of the United States